Juan del Campo (died 1344) was a Roman Catholic prelate who served as Bishop of León (1332–1334), Bishop of Oviedo (1328–1332), and Bishop of Cuenca (1327–1328).

Biography
On 8 Aug 1327, he was appointed during the papacy of Pope John XXII as Bishop of Cuenca.
On 27 Sep 1327, he was consecrated bishop by Bertrand de La Tour, Cardinal-Bishop of Frascati. 
On 7 May 1328, he was appointed during the papacy of Pope John XXII as Bishop of Oviedo.
On 2 Dec 1332, he was appointed during the papacy of Pope John XXII as Bishop of León.
He served as Bishop of León until his death on 24 May 1344.

References

External links and additional sources
 (for Chronology of Bishops) 
 (for Chronology of Bishops) 
 (for Chronology of Bishops) 
 (for Chronology of Bishops) 

14th-century Roman Catholic bishops in Castile
Bishops appointed by Pope John XXII
1334 deaths